Dalippur is a large village in the southwestern part of Jagdishpur block in Bhojpur district, Bihar, India. As of 2011, its population was 8,921, in 1,483 households.

References 

Villages in Bhojpur district, India